Kohlscheid is a railway station in the town of Kohlscheid, North Rhine-Westphalia, Germany. The station lies on the Aachen–Mönchengladbach railway and the train services are operated by Deutsche Bahn, some under the name Euregiobahn.

Train services
The station is served by the following services:

References

External links

 Map of Kohlscheid station 
 Current departures 

Railway stations in North Rhine-Westphalia
Railway stations in Germany opened in 1853